David Nelson (3 February 1918 – 27 September 1988) was a Scottish professional football player and manager, who played in the Football League for Brentford, Queens Park Rangers, Arsenal, Fulham and Crystal Palace as a wing half.

Career

St Bernard's 
A wing half, Nelson began his career with hometown junior club Douglas Water Thistle, before moving to Scottish League Second Division club St Bernard's in January 1936. He scored seven goals in 12 appearances during the second half of the 1935–36 season and left the club in May 1963.

Arsenal 
Nelson moved to England to sign for First Division club Arsenal for a £200 fee in May 1936. He made just 9 appearances before the Second World War broke out in September 1939, but had experienced some joy in the reserve team, winning the London Combination in 1936–37, 1937–38 and 1938–29. He made 164 appearances for the Gunners during the war and made further competitive appearances during the 1945–46 and 1946–47 seasons, before leaving Highbury in December 1946. Nelson made 29 competitive appearances and scored four goals in over a decade with Arsenal.

Wartime guest appearances 
Nelson guested for Motherwell, Celtic, Clapton Orient, Tottenham Hotspur, Brentford and Chesterfield during the Second World War and made three appearances for Southern League club Colchester United during the 1945–46 season.

Fulham 
Nelson joined Second Division club Fulham in December 1946, as a makeweight in the deal that took Ronnie Rooke to Arsenal. He made 24 appearances and scored four goals before departing Craven Cottage in July 1947.

Brentford 
Nelson and Fulham teammate Peter Buchanan signed for newly relegated Second Division club Brentford in a £6,000 deal in August 1947. He was a regular at wing half and departed Griffin Park in February 1950, having made 113 appearances and scored five goals.

Queens Park Rangers 
Nelson transferred to Second Division club Queens Park Rangers in February 1950, in an exchange deal for Bill Pointon. He remained at Loftus Road for just over two years and departed having made 31 appearances.

Crystal Palace 
Nelson dropped down to the Third Division South to sign for Crystal Palace in March 1952, but made just 12 appearances before departing the following year.

Ashford Town (Kent) 
Nelson ended his career as player-manager at Kent League club Ashford Town between March 1953 and December 1955.

Personal life 
Nelson served as a sergeant in the British Army during the Second World War. He emigrated to the United States in the late 1950s and worked at a car plant in St. Louis. At the time of his death, he was living in Greenwich, Connecticut.

Career statistics

References

1918 births
1988 deaths
Scottish footballers
St Bernard's F.C. players
Arsenal F.C. players
Fulham F.C. players
Brentford F.C. players
Queens Park Rangers F.C. players
Crystal Palace F.C. players
English Football League players
Association football wing halves
Ashford United F.C. players
Ashford United F.C. managers
Scottish expatriate sportspeople in the United States
British Army personnel of World War II
Clapton Orient F.C. wartime guest players
Tottenham Hotspur F.C. wartime guest players
Chesterfield F.C. wartime guest players
Brentford F.C. wartime guest players
Scottish football managers
Colchester United F.C. players
Southern Football League players
Motherwell F.C. wartime guest players
Celtic F.C. wartime guest players
Footballers from South Lanarkshire
British Army soldiers
Scottish emigrants to the United States
Douglas Water Thistle F.C. players
Kent Football League (1894–1959) players
People from Douglas Water